Alessandro "Sandro" Riminucci (born 26 June 1935) is a retired Italian professional basketball player. His nickname as a player, was "The Blonde Angel", due to his leaping ability. In 2006, he was induced into the Italian Basketball Hall of Fame.

Professional career
Riminucci was a member of the FIBA European Selection, in 1964.

Italian national team
Riminucci was a part of the senior Italian national basketball team that finished in fourth place at the 1960 Summer Olympics.

References

External links

1935 births
Living people
Italian men's basketball players
1963 FIBA World Championship players
Basketball players at the 1960 Summer Olympics
Olympic basketball players of Italy
Olimpia Milano players
Small forwards
Victoria Libertas Pallacanestro players